Máximo Gómez y Báez (November 18, 1836 – June 17, 1905) was a Dominican Generalissimo in Cuba's War of Independence (1895–1898). He was known for his controversial scorched-earth policy, which entailed dynamiting passenger trains and torching the Spanish loyalists' property and sugar plantations—including many owned by Americans. He greatly increased the efficacy of the attacks by torturing and killing not only Spanish soldiers, but also Spanish sympathizers. By the time the Spanish–American War broke out in April 1898, Gómez had the Spanish forces on the ropes. He refused to join forces with the Spanish in fighting off the United States, and he retired to a villa outside of Havana after the war's end.

Early life
Gómez was born on November 18, 1836 in the town of Baní, in the province of Peravia, in what is now the Dominican Republic. During his teenage years, he joined in the battles against the frequent Haitian incursions of Faustin Soulouque in the 1850s. He was later trained as an officer of the Spanish Army at the Zaragoza Military Academy  in Spain. He had arrived originally in Cuba as a cavalry officer, a captain, in the Spanish Army and fought alongside the Spanish forces in the Dominican Annexation War (1861–1865), earning promotion from captain to commander in a famous victory over the Dominican general, Pedro Florentino.

In Cuba, he married Bernarda Toro, who accompanied him during the war.

Changes allegiance
After the Spanish forces were defeated and fled the Dominican Republic in 1865 by the order of Queen Isabel II, many supporters of the Annexionist cause left with them, and Gómez moved his family to Cuba.

Gómez retired from the Spanish Army and soon took up the rebel cause in 1868, helping transform the Cuban Army's military tactics and strategy from the conventional approach, favored by Thomas Jordan and others. He gave the Cuban mambises their most feared tactic, the "machete charge."

Cuban War of Independence

On October 25, 1868, during the Battle of Pino de Baire, Gómez led a machete charge on foot, ambushing a Spanish column and obliterating it; the Spanish suffered 233 casualties. The Spanish Army was terrified of the charges because most were infantry troops, mainly conscripts, who were fearful of being cut down by the machetes. Because the Cuban Army always lacked sufficient munitions, the usual combat technique was to shoot once and then charge the Spanish.

In 1871, Gómez led a campaign to clear Guantánamo from forces loyal to Spain, particularly the rich coffee growers, who were mostly of French descent and whose ancestors had fled from Haiti after the Haitians had slaughtered the French. Gómez carried out a bloody but successful campaign, and most of his officers went on to become high-ranking officers, including Antonio and José Maceo, Adolfo Flor Crombet, Policarpo Pineda "Rustán."

After the death in combat of Major General Ignacio Agramonte y Loynáz in May 1873, Gómez assumed the command of the military district of the province of Camaguey and its famed Cavalry Corps. Upon first inspecting the corps, he concluded that they were the best trained and disciplined in the nascent indigenous Cuban Army, and they would significantly contribute to the war for independence.

On February 19, 1874, Gómez and 700 other rebels marched westward from their eastern base and defeated 2,000 Spanish troops at El Naranjo. The Spaniards lost 100 killed in action, 200 wounded in action; the rebels incurred 150 casualties. A battalion of 500 Chinese fought under the command of Gómez in the Battle of Las Guasimas (March 1874). The battle cost the Spanish 1,037 casualties and the rebels 174 casualties. However, the rebels had exhausted their resources: the unusual departure from guerrilla tactics had proved a costly enterprise.

In early 1875, with fewer than 2,000 men, Gómez crossed the Trocha—a string of Spanish military fortifications—and burned 83 plantations around Sancti Spíritus and freed their slaves. However, the conservative Revolutionary leaders feared the consequences of these actions and diverted troops away from Gómez' army, causing the campaign to fizzle. In 1876, Gómez surrendered his command when he was told by General Carlos Roloff that the officers of Las Villas would no longer follow his orders since he was Dominican.

Puerto Rican conflict
In the interlude between the two Cuban independence wars, Gómez held odd jobs in Jamaica and Panama (among them, he supervised a laborers' brigade during the construction of the Panama Canal), but he remained as an active player for the cause of Cuban independence as well as that for the rest of the Antilles. For example, when Puerto Rico experienced a period of severe political repression in 1887 by the Spanish governor, Romualdo Palacio, which led to the arrest of many local political leaders, including Román Baldorioty de Castro, Gómez offered his services to Ramón Emeterio Betances, the previous instigator of the island's first pro-independence revolution, the Grito de Lares, who was then exiled in Paris. Gómez sold most of his personal belongings to finance a revolt in Puerto Rico and volunteered to lead any Puerto Rican troops if any such revolt occurred. The revolt was deemed unnecessary later that year, when the Spanish government recalled  Palacio from office to investigate charges of abuse of power from his part, but Gómez and Betances established a friendship and logistical relationship that lasted until Betances's death, in 1898.

Promotion to general
Gómez rose to the rank of Generalíssimo of the Cuban Army, a rank akin to that of Captain General or General of the Army, because of his superior military leadership.

He adapted and formalized the improvised military tactics that had first been used by Spanish guerrillas against Napoleon Bonaparte's armies into a cohesive and comprehensive system, at both the tactical and the strategic levels. The concept of insurrection and insurgency and the asymmetric nature thereof can be traced intellectually to him.

He was shot in the neck in 1875 while he was crossing the fortified line or Trocha from Júcaro in the south to Morón, in the north; he was leading the failed attempt to invade Western Cuba. He then always wore a kerchief around his neck to cover the bullet hole, which remained open after it healed (he usually plugged it with a wad of cotton). His second and last wound came in 1896 while he was fighting in the rural areas outside Havana and completing a successful invasion of Western Cuba.

Fabian strategy
He was wounded only twice during 15 years of guerrilla warfare against an enemy far superior in manpower and logistics. In contrast, his most trusted officer and second-in-command, Lieutenant General Antonio Maceo y Grajales, was shot 27 times in the same span of time, with the 26th being the mortal wound. Gómez's son and Maceo's aide-de-camp, Francisco Gómez y Toro, nicknamed "Panchito," was killed while he was trying to recover Maceo's dead body in combat on December 7, 1896.

Soon afterward, Gómez implemented another warfare technique that proved to be very successful in crippling Spanish economic interests in Cuba: torching sugar cane haciendas and other strategic agricultural assets. He personally abhorred the idea of "setting to fire the product of our laborers' work over more than 200 years in a few hours" but countered that the state of misery most of the laborers still experienced, if that was the price to pay to redeem them from the economic system that enslaved them ¡Bendita sea la tea! ("Blessed be the torch!")

Proposal to join Spanish–American War
On March 5, 1898, the Captain-General of Cuba, Ramón Blanco y Erenas, proposed for Gómez and his Cuban troops to join him and the Spanish Army in repelling the United States in the face of the Spanish–American War. Blanco appealed to the shared heritage of the Cubans and Spanish and promised the island's autonomy if the Cubans would help fight the Americans. Blanco had declared, "As Spaniards and Cubans we find ourselves opposed to foreigners of a different race, who are of a grasping nature.... The supreme moment has come in which we should forget past differences and, with Spaniards and Cubans united for the sake of their own defense, repel the invader. Spain will not forget the noble help of its Cuban sons, and once the foreign enemy is expelled from the island, she will, like an affectionate mother, embrace in her arms a new daughter amongst the nations of the New World, who speaks the same language, practices the same faith, and feels the same noble Spanish blood run through her veins." Gómez refused to adhere to Blanco's plan.

Retirement

At the end of the Cuban Independence War in 1898, he retired to a villa outside of Havana. He refused the presidential nomination that was offered to him in 1901, which he was expected to win unopposed, mainly because he always disliked politics. Also, after 40 years of living in Cuba, he still felt that being Dominican-born, he should not become the civil leader of Cuba.

He died in his villa in 1905 and was interred in the Colón Cemetery, Havana.

Honors
Máximo Gómez Command Academy, an educational institution of the Cuban Revolutionary Armed Forces.

Máximo Gómez Park, a park in Miami, Florida, United States, better known as Domino Park, was named in his honor.

Gómez's portrait is portrayed on Cuban currency on the 10 peso bill.

The British alternative rock band Maxïmo Park named itself after a park in Florida, which had been named in his honor.

A major avenue in the city of Santo Domingo, in the Dominican Republic, is named after him.

A secondary school is named after him in his hometown of Baní, Dominican Republic.

A provincial university was named in his honor: Universidad Máximo Gómez Báez de Ciego de Ávila, in Cuba.

The current Dominican Senator for Peravia Province, Wilton Guerrero, has proposed changing the name of the province to "Máximo Gómez Province."

A statue is in the front of the Instituto Preuniversitario in Camaguey, Cuba; he is seen on a horse with his scarf galloping while he is armed as if leading a machete charge.

See also
Luis Marcano
Modesto Díaz

References

External links
 Horas de Tregua by Máximo Gómez and Néstor Carbonell in the Digital Library of the Caribbean

Cuban soldiers
Generalissimos
1836 births
1905 deaths
People of the Ten Years' War
Dominican Republic military personnel
Dominican Republic emigrants to Cuba
Dominican Republic people of Spanish descent
People from Baní
Cuban generals
19th-century Cuban military personnel
White Dominicans